Aram Mnatsakanov (born November 20, 1962) is a chef, restaurateur, television personality, host of Russian and Ukrainian versions of the world-famous TV shows Hell's Kitchen and Kitchen Nightmares. He currently owns and/or operates restaurants in Russia and Europe, such as Probka Restaurant Group, MINE in Berlin.

Early life 
Aram Mnatsakanov was born in Baku on November 20, 1962.

Television 
In 2011 he acted as host on the Ukrainian TV channel "1+1" in the television project Pekelna Kitchen (Ukrainian Hell's Kitchen). He spent three seasons on the reality show and received the following awards: National Television Award of Ukraine "Teletriumph" - "Best Reality Show" (2011); Best Chef of Ukraine according to Focus magazine (2011).

In 2012, he hosted the show On Knives (1+1 channel), the Ukrainian version of the famous reality TV show Ramsay's Kitchen Nightmares by Gordon Ramsay.

In 2012 and 2013, he spent two seasons on the Russian TV show Hell's Kitchen (REN TV channel).

In 2013, Aram Mnatsakanov and Olga Freimut were the hosts of the show War of the Worlds. The auditor against the Chef on the Ukrainian TV channel Novyi Kanal.

In 2014, he became the host of the original REN-TV series Realnaya kuhnya.

In 2019, he hosted the SuperChef show on Che channel (now Peretz channel), a version of Gordon Ramsay's 24 Hours to Hell and Back.

Restaurants 
In September 2001 Aram Mnatsakanov opened his first wine bar Probka in St. Petersburg.

In 2012 "Probka on Tsvetnoy" was opened - the first restaurant of Aram Mnatsakanov in Moscow at 2 Tsvetnoy Boulevard.

In January 2017 Aram Mnatsakanov opened his first restaurant in Berlin - "MINE". His son Mikhail Mnatsakanov leads a team of chefs with Artem Dovlatyan and Nicolas Lorieux. In March 2020, the MINE restaurant was included in the list of 33 restaurants recommended for visiting in the German capital by the Michelin guide in the "The Plate Michelin" category. The restaurant confirmed its status in 2021 and 2022.

Next door to the legendary restaurant “Probka na Dobrolyubova”, on the Petrogradskaya side in St. Petersburg, Aram Mnatsakanov opened his first Georgian restaurant “MAMA TUTA” in 2018.

In July 2020 Aram Mnatsakanov and his team opened two new projects simultaneously in the center of Moscow on Patriarch Ponds: the second Georgian restaurant "MAMA TUTA" and the new Italian restaurant “MARITOZZO”.

In 2021 restaurant R14 (previous name "Ryba") was included in Guide to the Best Pizzerias in the world.

In April 2021, the third Georgian restaurant Mama Tuta was opened on Bolshaya Morskaya Street, later in 2022 turned into Italian restaurant Da Manu Pizza & Aperitivo.

On September 5, 2021, the Italian-Lebanese restaurant Mina opened in Moscow on Malaya Nikitskaya Street.

On May 8, 2022, two projects were opened in St. Petersburg, in the same building on Krestovsky Island: the Italian-Lebanese restaurant Mina and pizzeria Da Manu. Then second Da Manu Pizza & Aperitivo Italian restaurant was opened on Bolshaya Morskaya Street in St. Petersburg, in the historical part of the city.

References 

Russian restaurateurs
Living people
1962 births
People from Baku